Cassietta George (January 23, 1929 – January 3, 1995) was an American gospel vocalist, and composer for many of the songs sung by The Caravans. George was a member of Queen of Gospel Albertina Walker's The Caravans, the most popular touring gospel group  from the late 1950s to the mid-1960s. She later launched a successful solo career, recording over 16 albums in Los Angeles for Audio Arts Inc. Along the way, George wrote over a hundred songs, and was twice nominated for a Grammy in 1969 & 1979, for Best Soul Gospel Performance. In 2017, she was inducted into the Memphis Music Hall of Fame.

Life and career
Cassietta Baker was born in 1929 in Memphis, Tennessee, United States, the daughter of Reverend Peter Baker and Cassietta. When she was four, she began singing in her father's church. She graduated from McKinley High School in Canton, Ohio, where she lived for a number of years. After she finished school, she returned to Memphis and sang for a while with the Songbirds of the South, one of the many female quartets in Memphis during the 1940s and early 1950s. She later sang with the Brewster Ensemble. In the 1953 she moved to Chicago, and in 1954 became a member of The Caravans, recording with them for States and Savoy. Her most popular song with the Caravans was a spirited arrangement of "Somebody Bigger than You and I". George began composing while with The Caravans and wrote more than twenty-five songs for them, including "To Whom Shall I Turn?" and "I Believe in Thee." Her style was influenced by that of Clara Ward. While a member of the Caravans, she sang with James Cleveland, Albertina Walker, Inez Andrews, Dorothy Norwood, Delores Washington and Shirley Caesar.

She died in Los Angeles, California, in January 1995, at the age of 65.

Selective discography

Footnotes

External links

Cassietta George official website

1929 births
1995 deaths
American gospel singers
20th-century American singers